O Re (also known as The King of Naples) is a 1989 Italian historical film written and directed by Luigi Magni. For his performance Carlo Croccolo won the David di Donatello for best supporting actor. The film also won the David di Donatello and the Nastro d'Argento for best costumes.

Plot 
In 1862, Francis II of Bourbon, the last king of the Two Sicilies, lives in exile in Rome (capital city of the Papal States) with his wife Maria Sophie and the butler Rafele. The king has lost his throne after the conquest of his kingdom by the forces of Giuseppe Garibaldi and the Piedmontese Army. Maria Sophie tries to recover the Kingdom of Naples, supporting the uprising of patriots, rebels and outlaws (named "briganti" by the Piedmontese Government), but Francesco is demoralized and has no intention of fighting. The king in fact closes in himself, expressing interest in religion and the supernatural...

Cast 
Giancarlo Giannini as King Francis II of the Two Sicilies
Ornella Muti as Queen Maria Sophie of Bavaria
Carlo Croccolo as Rafele
Luc Merenda as Don Josè Borjes
Cristina Marsillach as Luciana
Corrado Pani as General Coviello
Anna Maria Ackermann as Maria Theresa of Austria
Sergio Solli as Pulcinella
Iaia Forte as la Ferrarese
Alfredo Vasco as Carmine Crocco
Anna Kanakis as the brigant

References

External links

1989 films
Commedia all'italiana
Films directed by Luigi Magni
Films set in the 1860s
Films scored by Nicola Piovani
1980s Italian films